Rachel Anne McDowall (born 4 October 1984) is an English actress.

Early life
Rachel Anne McDowall was born on 4 October 1984 in Whiston, Merseyside. She developed an affinity for drama while attending Wade Deacon High School in nearby Widnes, Cheshire. She continued her acting studies at Laine Theatre Arts in Epsom, Surrey.

Career
McDowall made her film debut as Lisa in the 2008 film Mamma Mia! The Movie, and had her last of eight film or television roles in a 2016 episode of Zoe Ever After. On stage, she played Swedish woman Ulla in Mel Brooks' musical The Producers in the West End and Velma Kelly in productions of the musical Chicago, in the West End and at the Cambridge Theatre in 2008, and the Garrick Theatre in 2012.

Personal life 
On 16 May 2014, McDowall married Constantine Tzortzis, a Greek-American restaurant owner best known for his appearance on the 2007 season of The Bachelorette.

Filmography

Film

Television

Video games

References

External links 

1984 births
English film actresses
People from Whiston, Merseyside
People from Widnes
Living people
Actresses from Liverpool
21st-century English actresses